Adi Mere Tuisalalo Samisoni (born 28 July 1938) is a Fijian businesswoman and politician, from Lomaloma village on the island of Vanua Balavu in Fiji's Lau archipelago. Samisoni is current Member of Parliament for the Opposition Party SODELPA. She holds a Doctorate and master's degree in Business Administration and owns Hot Bread Kitchen and resides in Suva Fiji's Capital. She has served as Mayor of Lami and as a member of the now-defunct House of Representatives.

Politics
In March 2018, Samisoni was sworn-in as the newest Opposition Member of Parliament under the Social Democratic Liberal Party (SODELPA) succeeding the late Ratu Sela Nanovo MP who died due to an illness. During the 2014 Elections, Samisoni polled 1855 votes. Samisoni won the Lami Open Constituency for the ruling Soqosoqo Duavata ni Lewenivanua Party (SDL) at the parliamentary election held on 6–13 May 2006. It was her third attempt to win the seat: her previous campaigns in 1999 and 2001 (for the SVT Party) had been unsuccessful.

Personal life
Samisoni is the second youngest daughter of Ratu Keni Naulumatua, who held the title of Turaga na Rasau, and his first wife, Mere Tuisalalo Fonolahi.  She is well known for establishing a successful chain of bakeries throughout Fiji, and was married to the late Jimione Isimeli Samisoni of Rotuma, a doctor, lecturer and former Dean of the Fiji School of Medicine who had a great influence in the medical fraternity in Fiji and the Pacific. Together they had four children; John, Selina, Vanessa and Phillip.

Recent history
In the wake of the military coup which overthrew the government on 5 December 2006, Samisoni was detained by soldiers for questioning at Suva's Queen Elizabeth Barracks, Fiji Village reported, along with Daily Post General Manager Mesake Koroi.(source)  No reason was given for the questioning, but Samisoni had written a letter unsympathetic to the Military to the Fiji Times earlier in the week.  In a letter to the Fiji Sun published on 15 December, Samisoni claimed that soldiers had told her that if she did not discontinue writing letters critical of the military regime to newspapers, she would be imprisoned on Nukulau Island.

In April 2009, Samisoni was awarded the Doctorate of Business Administration by the University of the Sunshine Coast.(source)

In 2013, Samisoni's case was in the news again, when the Fiji government hired criminal attorney Clive Grossman to argue a jurisdictional matter related to the charges against Samisoni. Samisoni was represented by prominent human rights barrister, Sir Peter Williams QC and later by his widow, Lady Heeni Phillips who won the case. The case was dropped in 2016 in a voir dire hearing and the court granted Samisoni a nolle prosequi.

Footnotes

References
20th Century Fiji, edited by Stewart Firth & Daryl Tarte - 2001 - , (Reference article on Mere Samisoni)
Ai Vola Ni Kawa Bula, Reference to her connection to Chiefly family, The names and birth and death Register of Native Landowners details are as follows: Yavusa Buca, Tokatoka No.7 – Valelevu, Koro: Lomaloma, Tikina: Lomaloma, Yasana: Lau, from the Native Lands and Fisheries Commission – records as of July 19, 2005
A web link reference regarding details of the Native Lands and Fisheries Commission and the Ai Vola Ni Kawa Bula.
Lau Islands, Fiji By A.M Hocart, Published by the Bishop Museum, Hawaii (1929), this book has detailed references to her fathers Rank and Title and her Father Ratu Keni Naulumatua.
 Newspaper Article; Title: Fiji Born Actor dies, Content: Talks in reference to Manu Tupou the Hollywood actor, of his ties with Lomaloma with reference to Ratu Mara and Adi Mere(Mere Samisoni's Mother) and Ratu Dreunimisimisi, 2004,Fiji Times Saturday June 12, Fiji Times Archives
Weblink reference to recent events.

External links
 Ministerial Profile Of Mere Samsoni
 Jim Samisoni and details of his life and career

I-Taukei Fijian members of the House of Representatives (Fiji)
Living people
1938 births
Mayors of Lami, Fiji
Soqosoqo Duavata ni Lewenivanua politicians
Soqosoqo ni Vakavulewa ni Taukei politicians
I-Taukei Fijian people
Politicians from Vanua Balavu